Stermann & Grissemann are an Austrian／German comedy duo comprising Dirk Stermann and Christoph Grissemann.

Background

Dirk Stermann

Dirk Stermann (born 7 December 1965 in Duisburg) hails from Germany and is a German radio and television presenter and author. Stermann graduated from the University of Düsseldorf where he studied History and Theatre studies. In 1987 he moved to Austria and started working for the broadcaster Österreichischer Rundfunk in 1988.

Christoph Grissemann
Christoph Grissemann (born 17 May 1966 in Innsbruck) is an Austrian comedian, radio and television presenter. Grissemann is the second and youngest son of Austrian radio and television presenter Ernst Grissemann. Grissemann studied German and literature in the spa town of Baden bei Wien. He took part in the Alternative civilian service. Following his father, Grisseman joined the broadcaster Österreichischer Rundfunk.

Joining forces

Stermann and Grissemann met back in 1988 when they were working for ORF. In 1989 they joined Salon Helga on Hitradio Ö3 which they hosted until 1997. Thereafter they moved to the radio station FM4 and began hosting various shows such as Suite 16 and Blech oder Blume. Between 1995 and 2002 they provided the FM4 radio commentary for the Eurovision Song Contest. Between 1998 and 2011 they were regular radio hosts for the regional German radio station Radio Eins.

Television presenting
In 2002 Stermann & Grissemann attempted to represent Austria at the Eurovision Song Contest 2002 with the song Das schönste Ding der Welt, where they finished 2nd. Also in 2002 they hosted the 2002 Edition of Salzburger Stier. In 2005 they hosted the late night show for ORF1 Dorfers Donnerstalk. Two years later they also began hosting the late night talk show Willkommen Österreich. Since May 2008 they have hosted the comedy show Im Anschluss: Neues aus Waldheim on Sky Deutschland. After 10 years Stermann & Grissemann returned to the commentary box for the Eurovision Song Contest where they provided the second layer of commentary for the 2012 Contest as well as the FM4 radio commentary.

Work

TV programmes
 1999: Das Ende zweier Entertainer – Ein Scheißabend für alle Beteiligten
 2000: Die Karawane des Grauens
 2002: Willkommen in der Ohrfeigenanstalt
 2005: Harte Hasen
 2007: Die Deutsche Kochschau
 2011: Stermann

Theater
 2003: Seele brennt – A Tribute to Werner Schwab (with Hilde Sochor and Fritz Ostermayer)
 2003: Marx Brothers Show

Books
 Als wir noch nicht von Funk und Fernsehen kaputtgemacht geworden sind? edition selene, Wien 1998, 
 Immer nie am Meer. edition selene, Wien 1999, 
 Willkommen in der Ohrfeigenanstalt. Hoanzl, Wien 2002, 
 be afraid honey, it's ... fm4. Die geheimen Anstalts-Tagebücher. edition selene, Wien 2004, 
 be afraid honey, it’s... fm4. Die geheimen Anstalts-Tagebücher von Stermann und Grissemann. Letzte Folge. edition selene, Wien 2005, 
 Debilenmilch. Tropen Verlag, Berlin 2007, 
 Speichelfäden in der Buttermilch: Gesammelte Werke I, Tropen Bei Klett-Cotta, Stuttgart 2011,

CDs
 Salon Helga – von hinten
 Das Ende Zweier Entertainer – Ein Scheißabend für alle Beteiligten
 Du auch
 Die Karawane des Grauens
 Sprechen Sie Österreichisch? (Als Sprecher)
 2002: Die Schönste CD der Welt
 Willkommen in der Ohrfeigenanstalt
 Leck Mich im Arsch – Bäsle Briefe

DVDs
 Harte Hasen
 Immer nie am Meer
 Wollt Ihr das totale Sieb!?
 Guten Morgen

External links 

 Stermann & Grissemann Official Website

Austrian comedy duos
1965 births
Living people
People from Duisburg
Mass media people from North Rhine-Westphalia
German comedians
German comedy duos
German male writers
Heinrich Heine University Düsseldorf alumni
1966 births
Mass media people from Innsbruck
Austrian television presenters
Austrian radio personalities
Austrian comedians
Austrian entertainers
ORF (broadcaster) people